SKI is a citrus soda made from real orange and lemon juice. It is manufactured by the Excel Bottling Company.

History
SKI Citrus Soda was formulated in Chattanooga, Tennessee at The Double Cola Company headquarters. The formula was perfected on August 10, 1956. SKI was registered two years later in May of 1958. The product was launched to the public that summer. When coming up for the name, management asked the staff to submit their best ideas. Then employee, Dot Myers, submitted the names SKI and SKEE after being inspired from a weekend Skiing trip on the Chickamauga lake. Management loved the name SKI.

In 1999, the SKI can and logo was redesigned with the phrase "Taste the Wake."

In 2009, the SKI can and logo were redesigned,  an online vote was posted on the official SKI website to vote on a selected logo. Along with the redesigned cans, Cherry SKI was re-branded as "SKI InfraRED".

In 2009 the selected can design hits markets with the phrase "Real Lemon, Real Orange, Real Good!"

Distribution
SKI is bottled in several bottling facilities across the United States. Ski is distributed in Alabama, Alaska, California, Georgia, Indiana, Illinois, Kentucky, Missouri, North Carolina, Ohio, Tennessee, Utah, Virginia, and West Virginia.

Although the origins to SKI have no known connection to the city of Evansville, Indiana, the product is well known there, and has become a significant part of the local culture. The bottling plant located in Greensburg, Kentucky also makes it a regional staple in the Southern part of the state.

Promotions
Ski has been a supporter of NASCAR Camping World Truck Series team MB Motorsports with drivers such as Justin Jennings and Kyle Donahue.

Ski is also featured in the chorus of the song "Dumas Walker" by The Kentucky Headhunters ("Let's all go, down to Dumas Walker/We'll get a slaw burger, fries and a bottle of Ski/Bring it on out to my baby and me.")

See also
 List of regional beverages of the United States

References

External links
 
 Double Cola
 Ski For Your Pleasure - Joe Henken Ski collector's fan site

Citrus sodas
Products introduced in 1956